Pachliopta hector, the crimson rose, is a large swallowtail butterfly belonging to the genus Pachliopta (roses) of the red-bodied swallowtails. It is recorded as a species of "Least Concern (LC)" by IUCN.

Range
It is found in India, Sri Lanka, Maldives and possibly the coast of western Myanmar.

In India, it is found in the Western Ghats, southern India (Tamil Nadu, Kerala), eastern India (West Bengal and Odisha). It is a straggler in the Andaman Islands.

Status
It is generally common and not known to be threatened. It is common all along the Western Ghats up to Maharashtra but rare in Gujarat. This species is protected by law in India.

Description
The male's upperside is black. Forewing with a broad white interrupted band from the subcostal nervure opposite the origin of veins 10 and 11, extended obliquely to the tornus, and a second short pre-apical similar band; both bands composed of detached irregularly indented broad streaks in the interspaces. Hindwing with a distal posteriorly strongly curved series of seven crimson spots followed by a subterminal series of crimson lunules. Cilia black alternated with white. Underside: forewing dull brownish black, hindwing black; markings as on the upperside, but the crimson spots and crescent-shaped markings on the hindwing larger. Antennae, thorax and abdomen above at base, black; head and rest of the abdomen bright crimson; beneath: iho palpi, the sides of the thorax and abdomen crimson.

The female is similar, the discal series of spots and subterminal lunules much duller, pale crimson irrorated (sprinkled) with black scales; in some specimens the anterior spots and lunules almost white barely tinged with crimson; abdomen above with the black colour extended further towards the apex.

No geographic races have been described.

Habitat
This butterfly is at home both in jungle and in open country. During the dry season, it will be found up to 8000 feet (2400 m) in South India, but it is found all the year round at lower elevations.

Habits

It is a very striking tailed butterfly with prominent white bands on its forewings. The crimson rose is very fond of flowers especially Lantana. Nectar appears to be essential for the butterfly and a higher nectar intake is thought to increase egg production.

Close to the ground, the flight of the crimson rose is slow and fluttering but steady. At greater heights, it flies faster and stronger. It basks with its wings spread flat, sometimes in small congregations at heights of 10 to 15 metres up in the trees.

The butterfly often roosts for the night in large companies on the twigs and branches of trees and shrubs, sometimes accompanied by a few common Mormons. When resting the butterfly draws its forewings halfway between the hindwings. The butterfly sleeps on slanting outstretched branches or twigs of trees or bushes.

Aposematism and mimicry

The red body, slow peculiar flight, bright colouration and pattern of the wings are meant to indicate to predators that this butterfly is inedible, being well protected by the poisons it has sequestered from its larval food plant. Its flight and behaviour is much like that of the common Mormon. Like that butterfly, it too is inedible and rarely attacked by predators. This has led to this butterfly also being mimicked by a female morph of the common Mormon (Papilio polytes), in this case, the female form romulus.

Migration
The most striking aspect of the butterfly's behaviour is its strong migratory tendencies. During the peak of its season, several thousand crimson roses can be found congregating and then they begin migrating to other areas.

In the Entomologist's Monthly Magazine, 1880, p. 276, Mr. R. S. Eaton notes that in Bombay this butterfly roosted in great numbers together, however Charles Thomas Bingham notes that in the Western Ghats between Vengurla and Belgaum, where the butterfly occurred in some numbers and had the habit of roosting in company on twigs of some thorny shrub, but never saw more than "a score or so together".

Life cycle

Higher numbers of them are seen from August to November and also from April to June. They breed up to seven times per year and it has been found to take only 39–47 days from egg to adult.

Eggs
Similar to those of the common rose, the eggs hatch in seven days.

Caterpillars
The caterpillars of the crimson rose are similar to those of the common rose butterflies, but are purplish black or blackish brown with a little bit of red, pink and orange colors on there wings. They have a black head and orange osmeterium. Their bodies are fat, with orange-red tubercles and a prominent yellowish-white band transversely placed on segments six to eight. The caterpillar has five instars. The caterpillars are known to display cannibalistic behaviour.

Pupa
The pupa is pinkish brown with darker expanded wing cases. The wing-like expansions on the abdomen are distinctive.

Food plants
The larvae of the species breed on various species of Aristolochia including Aristolochia indica, Aristolochia bracteolata, and Thottea siliquosa. The species is unpalatable as they sequester chemical compounds in their larval stages including aristolochic acid from the host plants.

Nectar resources
The nectar sources of the crimson rose with details of the flowering period are as follows:
 Adathoda zeylonica January–March
 Albizzia lebbeck March–June
 Anacardium occidentale December–March
 Antigonon leptopus year-long
 Bougainvillea spectabilis year-long
 Caesalpinia pulcherrima year-long
 Capparis spinosa December–February
 Carissa carandus year-long (April–July)
 Catharanthus roseus year-long
 Citheroxylum subserratum April–June
 Clerodendrum infortunatum February–April
 Duranta repens June–December
 Hibiscus rosa-sinensis year-long
 Hyptis suaveolens September–January
 Jasminum angustifolium June–August
 Lantana camara year-long
 Muntingia calabura year-long
 Nerium odorum year-long
 Premna latifolia March–August
 Sida acuta August–December
 Sida cordifolia August–December
 Stachytarpheta indica June–September
 Wrightia tinctoria April–June
 Zizyphus oenoplia August–December and March–June

Etymology
In common with other early naturalists Linnaeus followed the classical tradition. The name honours the Greek hero Hector.

Cited references

References

External links

 The Common Rose
 Srilankan insects
 Autecology of the endemic Crimson Rose

Hector
Butterflies of Asia
Butterflies described in 1758
Taxa named by Carl Linnaeus